South Korean boy band BTS have released 42 singles as lead artist—three of which are soundtrack appearances, nine singles as a featured artist, two promotional singles, and over 100 other non-single songs. In Japan, according to Oricon and the Recording Industry Association of Japan (RIAJ), several of the band's singles are among the most-streamed songs of all time in the country and have set various other streaming and certification records that no other artist or group act in the history of either organization has. In the United States, per Billboard, they have sold over 3.1 million tracks (72.3% of K-pop digital track sales) as of 2021, and hold the record for the most number-one singles in the 2020s decade, with six.

BTS debuted in South Korea on June 12, 2013, with the single "No More Dream", which peaked at number 124 on the Gaon Digital Chart and sold 50,000 copies. To support their first extended play, O!RUL8,2?, the band released "N.O", which met with minor commercial success domestically. They released four singles in 2014, "Boy in Luv", "Just One Day", "Danger" and "War of Hormone", all of which entered the Digital Chart. "Boy in Luv performed the best of the five and reached the top 50 of the chart—it sold over 200,000 copies by year's end.

"I Need U", released in April 2015, reached the top five of the Gaon Digital Chart, and peaked at number three on Billboards World Digital Songs chart in the United States. BTS released two more singles in 2015, "Dope" and "Run"—the latter reached the top ten in South Korea. The band's fourth Japanese single, "For You", was released on June 17, 2015, and became its first number one hit in Japan, topping both the Oricon Singles Chart and Billboard Japans Hot 100. The Japanese version of "I Need U" arrived in December 2015 and debuted at number one on the Singles Chart. A follow-up Japanese single, "Run", was released on March 15, 2016.

BTS scored their first number-one hit with "Blood Sweat & Tears" in late 2016, selling more than 1.5 million copies in South Korea and reaching number one on the US World Digital Songs chart. The single's Japanese version followed in May 2017 and became their first to be certified Platinum by the RIAJ. The group released three other singles that year: "Spring Day", "Not Today", and "DNA". All three reached the top ten in South Korea and achieved first place on the World Digital Songs chart. "DNA" peaked at 67 on the US Hot 100. A remix of "MIC Drop" by American DJ Steve Aoki and rapper Desiigner was released in November 2017, reaching the top 40 of the Hot 100 and becoming the first song by a Korean boy group to be certified gold by the Recording Industry Association of America, in February 2018. The track was later certified platinum. A Japanese version of the single, including "DNA" and "Crystal Snow", was released in December 2017 and sold over 500,000 physical copies within a month, becoming the only record by a foreign artist to be certified Double Platinum by the RIAJ in 2017.

As lead artist

2010s

2020s

As featured artist

Promotional singles

Other charted songs

Other collaborations

Notes

References

Discographies of South Korean artists
Hip hop group discographies
K-pop music group discographies